Club Centro Deportivo Municipal, commonly known as Deportivo Municipal, is a Peruvian football club based in Lima, Peru. They are among Peru's most recognizable clubs and enjoy considerable popularity. The bulk of their success was won a few years after the club was founded in 1935. The club was a top-flight contender during this period and won four Primera División titles. The club suffered relegation three times in their history: 1967, 2000, and 2007. They have also been champions of the Segunda División on three occasions: 1968, 2006, and 2014, granting them promotion to the first division. In 2014, they won the Segunda División and they currently compete in the Primera División Peruana.

Deportivo Municipal was one of the first Peruvian clubs to participate in a South American international football competition. In 1948, they were invited to the South American Championship of Champions and finished fourth where clubs from seven of the then nine CONMEBOL football associations that participated.

History
Club Centro Deportivo Municipal was founded upon the initiative of three municipal directors of Lima, who intended to have a football team representing the municipality of the city. Thus Círculo Deportivo Municipal was formed, which in 1934 merged with another team to create Centro Deportivo Municipal, participating in the promotion tournament in 1935.

The club was officially founded on 27 July 1935 in the Municipality of Lima. After finishing second in the promotion tournament, the team won the right to play in the Primera División in 1936, and obtained its first national title in 1938.

Deportivo Municipal was relegated in 1967, and promoted again in 1968. The club stayed in the top category until 2000, when it ended last in the season. The team was relegated to the Segunda División, where it played until 2006, when promotion was achieved by winning the title with 45 points in 22 matches. They were relegated again in 2007 after a troublesome season with failing to pay its players for several months.

In the 2011 Torneo Intermedio, the club was eliminated by José Gálvez in the quarter-finals. It reached the national stage of the 2012 Copa Perú and was invited to play in the Segunda División once again.

On 2014, the club gained promotion to the Primera División Peruana for the first time in 7 years after beating Unión Huaral.

Uniform
It consists of a white jersey with a red stripe that goes from left to right, blue shorts and white socks. Its alternative uniform varies, it has 3 options. The first one has a red jersey and keeps the blue shorts and white socks. The second alternative uniform keeps the red stripe on the jersey but instead of being white, it is blue. The shorts and socks are also blue. The third alternative uniform uses black instead of blue (as the 2nd choice) but also keeps the red stripe on the jersey. The home shirt's colors are reminiscent of the Peruvian national team, and it refers to the fact that the day of its foundation in 1935 was the day before Peruvian Independence Day.

Kit Evolution

Stadium
Deportivo Municipal has employed the use of several stadiums throughout its history. Some of these grounds include the Estadio Nacional, Estadio Municipal de Chorrillos, Estadio Miguel Grau, Estadio Alejandro Villanueva, Estadio Universidad San Marcos and the former Estadio San Martín de Porres. Most recently, the club has adopted the Estadio Iván Elías Moreno in Villa El Salvador for their home games.

Honours

National

League
Peruvian Primera División:
Winners (4): 1938, 1940, 1943, 1950
Runner-up (8): 1941, 1942, 1944, 1945, 1946, 1947, 1951, 1981

Torneo Regional:
Winners (1): 1981

Peruvian Primera División Unificada de Lima y Callao:
Winners (1): 1936

Peruvian Segunda División:
Winners (3): 1968, 2006, 2014
Runner-up (1): 2004

División Intermedia:
Runner-up (1): 1935

Copa Perú:
Runner-up (1): 2004

National cups
Torneo Intermedio:
Winners (1): 1993

Regional
Región IV:
Runner-up (1): 2012

Liga Departamental de Lima: 
Winners (1): 2012

Liga Provincial de Lima: 
Winners (1): 2012

Liga Distrital de Breña: 
Winners (1): 2012

Liga Distrital de Cercado de Lima: 
Winners (1): 2011

Friendly National
Copa Callao:
Winners (1): 2007

Performance in CONMEBOL competitions
Copa Libertadores: 2 appearances
1982: Group Stage 
2017: First Stage
Copa Sudamericana: 2 appearances
2016: First Stage
2019: First Stage
Copa de Campeones: 1 appearance
1948: Fourth Place
Copa Ganadores de Copa: 1 appearance
1970: First Stage

Current squad

Notable players

 Fernando Martinuzzi (2007)
 Ángel Clemente Rojas (1972–73)
 Masakatsu Sawa (2007), (2014–2017)
 Alfredo Carmona (1994–96)
 César Cueto (1974)
 Jefferson Farfán (1993–00)
  Raul Geller (1956–59)
 Eduardo Malásquez (1976–82), (1985)
 Máximo "Vides" Mosquera
 Franco Navarro (1980–82)
 Juan Seminario (1954–59)
 Nolberto Solano (1993)
 Hugo Sotil (1968–73), (1981–82)
 Jorge Soto (1990–92)
 José Soto (1987–92)
 Jerry Tamashiro (1994–96)

Managers
  Juan Valdivieso (19??–??)
  Zózimo (1976)
  Juan Hohberg (1983)
  Ramón Quiroga (1990–92)
  Julio César Uribe (1995)
  Agustín Castillo (1997–99)
  Ramón Quiroga (1998)
  Hugo Sotil (1999)
  Horacio Raúl Baldessari (2000)
  Roberto Mosquera (2007)
  Héctor Chumpitaz (2012)
  Roberto Pompei (2015)
   (2015–)

See also
List of football clubs in Peru
Peruvian football league system

References

External links

Facebook page

 
Football clubs in Lima
Association football clubs established in 1935
1935 establishments in Peru